Bellows Falls is an incorporated village located in the town of Rockingham in Windham County, Vermont, United States.  The population was 2,747 at the 2020 census. Bellows Falls is home to the Green Mountain Railroad, a heritage railroad; the annual Roots on the River Festival; and the No Film Film Festival.

History

The community was settled in 1753 by colonists of English descent, who called it Great Falls. Later the settlers renamed the town for Colonel Benjamin Bellows, a landowner, but kept the name Great Falls for the waterfall, a translation of their Abenaki name, "Kitchee pontegu." In 1785, Colonel Enoch Hale built at the falls the first bridge over the Connecticut River. It was the only bridge across the river until 1796, when another was built at Springfield, Massachusetts. The bridge was later replaced. Two bridges currently link Bellows Falls to New Hampshire: the New Arch Bridge (also called the Church Street Bridge), which replaced the Arch Bridge in 1982, and the Vilas Bridge.

The Bellows Falls Canal, one of the first canals built in the United States, was dug by a British-owned company from 1791 to 1802.  The original canal was  22 feet wide and four feet deep, and had 9 locks, each 75 feet long and 20 feet wide, which allowed shipping to go around Great Falls by being lifted 52 feet (16 m) around the gorge. River traffic declined after railroads were built to the Connecticut Valley in 1849, and by 1858 the canal had become used exclusively for water power to run the paper mills which became established there.  In 1874 the canal was enlarged to 75 feet wide and 17 feet deep.  By 1908 it was delivering 15,000 horsepower to the mills.  When the mills replaced water power with electrical power, the canal was widened again in 1927–28 to 100 feet, and the water was used to power turbines to generate electricity.  The canal's bottom was lined with concrete, and the sides secured with rip-rap set in concrete. A fish ladder allows salmon to continue upstream at times when the bulk of the river's flow is diverted to the canal.  The canal is now part of the Bellows Falls Downtown Historic District.

In 1802, entrepreneurs built the first paper mill in Windham County.  Two railroads converged in 1849 at Bellows Falls, helping it develop into a major mill town. By 1859, a woolen textile mill was operating, in addition to factories that produced furniture, marble, sashes and blinds, iron castings, carriages, cabinetware, rifles, harness, shoe pegs and organs.

The years of industry created wealth in the town, and substantial Victorian houses and mercantile buildings were constructed. Bellows Falls today attracts visitors through heritage tourism based on its historic Victorian architecture.  The commercial town center, along with the canal, the bridges spanning it, and several neighborhoods of houses, were listed as historic districts on the National Register of Historic Places, as were individual landmarks such as the historic railroad station and the Adams Gristmill Warehouse.

Geography
The village is located within the town of Rockingham. Bellows Falls is bounded on the east by the Connecticut River.

Demographics
As of the census of 2000, there were 3,165 people, 1,329 households, and 782 families residing in the village.  The population density was 2,286.1 people per square mile (885.5/km2).  There were 1,443 housing units at an average density of 1,042.3/sq mi (403.7/km2).  The racial makeup of the village was 97.28% White, 0.35% African American, 0.16% Native American, 0.51% Asian, 0.03% Pacific Islander, 0.22% from other races, and 1.45% from two or more races. Hispanic or Latino of any race were 1.14% of the population.

There were 1,329 households, out of which 32.2% had children under the age of 18 living with them, 40.0% were couples living together and joined in either marriage or civil union, 14.1% had a female householder with no husband present, and 41.1% were non-families. 34.5% of all households were made up of individuals, and 16.7% had someone living alone who was 65 years of age or older.  The average household size was 2.35 and the average family size was 3.01.

In the village, the population was spread out, with 26.1% under the age of 18, 7.8% from 18 to 24, 28.3% from 25 to 44, 21.5% from 45 to 64, and 16.2% who were 65 years of age or older.  The median age was 37 years. For every 100 females, there were 94.1 males.  For every 100 females age 18 and over, there were 88.6 males.

The median income for a household in the village was $29,608, and the median income for a family was $45,688. Males had a median income of $29,137 versus $22,340 for females. The per capita income for the village was $15,276.  About 5.6% of families and 12.6% of the population were below the poverty line, including 14.3% of those under age 18 and 15.9% of those age 65 or over.

Tourism
One of Bellows Falls' cultural attractions is the Bellows Falls Petroglyph Site: petroglyphs on large boulders, located just downstream of the bridge.

Transportation

Notable people
 Donald H. Balch — United States Air Force general
 Colleen Barrett — Former president of Southwest Airlines
 Mark Brown (baseball) — American baseball player
 E. William Crotty — American diplomat
 Donald E. Edwards — American state military officer
 Carlton Fisk — American baseball player
 Robert Gillis — American college football coach
 Jay H. Gordon — American politician
 
 Hetty Green — American businesswoman and financier
 James F. Howard Jr. — Professor of neurology
 Bruce M. Lawlor — Retired United States Army officer
 Israel Lund — Conceptual painter
 Guy McPherson — scientist
 Michael J. Obuchowski — Former member of the Vermont House of Representatives
 Roger Robb — American judge
 Thomas M. Salmon — Vermont Auditor of Accounts from 2007 to 2013
 Thomas P. Salmon — American politician
 Jennie Maria Arms Sheldon — American author, scientist and researcher
 Gary Smith (record producer) — American businessman
 Ernest Thompson — American writer, actor, and director
 Matt Trieber — American politician
 Rick Veitch — American comics artist and writer
 Asa Wentworth Jr. — American politician

See also
 
 
 Steamtown, U.S.A.

References

External links

 Town of Rockingham and Village of Bellows Falls, Vermont

 
Federal architecture in Vermont
Incorporated villages in Vermont
Rockingham, Vermont
Vermont populated places on the Connecticut River
Victorian architecture in Vermont
Villages in Windham County, Vermont